The Old Artillery Barracks, also known as Irgens House (Danish: Irgens Gård) after an earlier owner, was the first of three barracks to be established in the Christianshavn district of Copenhagen, Denmark. The complex has been converted into apartments and is listed.

History

17th century
The first buildings on the site were probably constructed in the 1620s or 1630s. In 1664, Joachim Irgens (1611-75) purchased the property. He carried out comprehensive alterations and extensions, creating the complex seen today. 
The property was later owned by Nicolai Jensen Arf frp, 1680 to 1699. In 170+1697, he held a monopoly on trade on the Danish Gold Coast.

18th century

The complex was acquired by merchant Peter Borre in 1751. His property was listed as No. 45 in the new cadastre of 1756. Borre and his business partner Peter Fenger were in 1760 granted a royal privilege to establish a sugar refinery in the complex but the plans were most likely not realized. Borre was instead appointed as manager of the country's newly monopolized tobacco industry in return for 12½ % of the government's incomes from the tobacco trade. The monopoly existed until 1778. Borre's daughter, Birgitte Kirstine Borre (1757-1809), married the merchant Charles August Selbye, a neighbor, on 26 November 1777.

In 1783, Borre sold the property to director of the Royal Greenland Trading Department Hartvig Marcus Frich. At the time of the 1787 census, Frisch resided in the building with his wife Dorothee Frisch (née Tutein), their two-year-old daughter Henriette Cauline Frisch, his 17-year-old niece Arengoth Sophie Føns, three maids, a male servant, a coachman and a concierge,

Strandgade Artillery Barracks

The property was converted into barracks for the Artillery in 1789. The larger Bådsmandsstræde Barracks opened on a nearby site adjacent to the Christianshavn Rampart in 1836 but the Old Artillery Barracks remained in use until 1923.

Architecture
The complex is bounded by Strandgade to the west, Bådsmandsstræde to the north and Wildersgade to the east, forming the northern part of a block which is completed by Sankt Annæ Gade to the south. The buildings seen today mainly date from 1700, although further alterations took place in 1779. They are built in brick with yellow dressing and tile roofs.

The complex surrounds a cobbled interior courtyard with large trees. A free-standing building in the courtyard dates from 1750.

See also
 Royal Horse Guards Barracks
 Rosenborg Barracks
 Sølvgade Barracks
 Wildersgade Barracks
 Peter Fenger (1719–1774)

References

External links

 Official website
 Source
 Source

Barracks in Copenhagen
Listed residential buildings in Copenhagen
Listed buildings and structures in Christianshavn
1789 establishments in Denmark
1923 disestablishments in Denmark